Events from the year 1944 in Italy.

Incumbents
King: Victor Emmanuel III; from the 5 June, his functions were performed  by the prince Umberto as “Lieutenant of the Kingdom”. 
Prime Minister: Pietro Badoglio (Until 24 April, “government of experts”;  until 18 June, national unity government with the six parties of the CLN), Ivanoe Bonomi (starting 18 June; till December 12, national unity government with the six parties of the CLN; later, national unity government but without PSI and Pd'A.)

Northern Italy is formally ruled by the Mussolini’s Italian Social Republic. The effective power in Italy was in the hands of the German and allied occupiers.

From spring to autumn, several free republics were constituted by the Italian partisans (particularly Ossola), but they had all fallen to the Germans and fascists by the end of the year.

Events
January 8–10 - Verona trial
January 17/May 18: battle of Monte Cassino
January 22: landings in Anzio 
January 30 – February 2 - Battle of Cisterna
March 1/7: general strike in the Northern Italy
March 2/3 - Balvano train disaster
March 18: the Badoglio cabinet is acknowledged by the Soviet Union and, later, by the Allied. 
March 24 - Ardeatine massacre
June 3: foundation of the CGIL, gathering the unions of every political tendency
June 4: liberation of Rome
June 9: institution of the Corp of the Freedom's Volunteer, military organization of the Italian resistance.
June 16 – July 18 - Battle of Ancona
August 12 - Sant'Anna di Stazzema massacre
August 22: Florence is freed by the Italian partisans and by the Allied army.
August 25: the Gothic line offensive begins.
September 4–15 - Battle of Gemmano
September 29 - Marzabotto massacre
November 13: in a radio proclamation, Harold Alexander announces the end of the Allied offensive and asks the Italian partisans to cease military operations.  
December 26–28 - Battle of Garfagnana
December 28: the CLNAI (National Liberation Committee for Northern Italy) is acknowledged as representative of Italian government in the occupied territory.

Literature and culture 

 L’Adalgisa (Carlo Emilio Gadda)
 Kaputt (Curzio Malaparte)
The naked streets (by Vasco Pratolini).
Il marito in collegio (The husband in the boarding school, by Giovanni Guareschi)
Ascolto il tuo cuore, città (Listening to your heart, city, by Alberto Savinio).

In the freed Italy, the first cultural magazines inspired to the antifascist beliefs appear : Aretusa, Mercurio, La nuova Europa and Rinascita (official  review of the PCI). In Florence, Italia e Civiltà, voice of the more moderate fascist wing, goes out for a few months.

Cinema 
In spite of the tragic war situation, a fair number of new Italian movies, generally realized before the armistice, goes out in cinemas, (Sorelle Materassi, by Poggioli; The innkeeper, by Chiarini ; La donna della montagna, by Castellani). A limited film production goes on North Italy. Vivere ancora, began by Leo Longanesi in Rome the last year, is completed in Turin by Francesco de Robertis. In Venice, the authorities of the Italian Social Republic try to establish a new Cinecittà, called Cinevillaggio but the studios realize only a dozen of movies, of poor artistic value. In Rome, Vittorio De Sica directs The gates of heaven, produced by the Vatican. The processing of the movie, protracted for seven months, allows many antifascists, as De Sica himself, to wait in relative tranquility for the liberation of the city.

Births
January 5 - Franco Ferrini, screenwriter
April 6 - Anita Pallenberg, film actress and model (d. 2017)
September 24 - Enzo Sciotti, artist and illustrator (d. 2021)

Deaths
January 11 (executed by firing squad):
Emilio De Bono, military leader, 77
Galeazzo Ciano, politician, 40
Giovanni Marinelli, politician, 64
March 24 - Pietro Pappagallo
March 27 - Eduino Francini, partisan, 18 (killed in action)
September 22 - Pietro Caruso
October 13 - Don Giovanni Fornasini, Gold Medal of Military Valour, Servant of God, murdered at Marzabotto by a Waffen SS soldier

See also
Italian Campaign (World War II)

 
1940s in Italy
Years of the 20th century in Italy